The 1983 European Grand Prix (formally the John Player Grand Prix of Europe) was a Formula One motor race held at Brands Hatch on 25 September 1983. It was the fourteenth race of the 1983 Formula One World Championship.

The 76-lap race was won by Nelson Piquet, driving a Brabham-BMW. Piquet's Drivers' Championship rival Alain Prost was second in a factory Renault, while Nigel Mansell was third in a Lotus-Renault. With the win, Piquet moved within two points of Prost at the top of the championship with one race remaining.

Background
A third Grand Prix in the United States (after the earlier races at Long Beach and Detroit) was to have been held on this date, on a track at the Flushing Meadows–Corona Park in Queens, New York City, but was cancelled at short notice due to local protests. A second race in the United Kingdom, at Brands Hatch, was quickly organised in its place, and was the first Formula One race to be officially titled the European Grand Prix: this title had, until 1977, been an honorific title given to one race held in Europe each year alongside its official, national title.

Qualifying

Qualifying report
Elio de Angelis surprised by taking pole position in his Lotus-Renault, with teammate Nigel Mansell third. Between them was the Brabham-BMW of Riccardo Patrese, with Nelson Piquet fourth in the other Brabham. The Ferraris filled the third row with René Arnoux ahead of Patrick Tambay, while the factory Renaults took up the fourth row, Eddie Cheever ahead of Drivers' Championship leader Alain Prost. Completing the top ten were Manfred Winkelhock in the ATS and John Watson in the McLaren.

The fastest non-turbo car was the Williams of Keke Rosberg in 16th; teammate Jacques Laffite failed to qualify. Williams had planned to debut their Honda turbo-powered FW09 at this race, but instead decided to wait until the season finale in South Africa. The team, did, however, enter a third car for test driver and Formula Two champion Jonathan Palmer, who qualified 25th.

Qualifying classification

Race

Race report
At the start, Riccardo Patrese took the lead from Elio de Angelis, followed by Nigel Mansell, Nelson Piquet and Eddie Cheever. On lap 2 Piquet passed Mansell, who was having trouble with his tyres and would soon fall to seventh, while Alain Prost made a charge to run fourth by lap 9.

Patrese and de Angelis had pulled clear of the rest of the field when, on lap 11, de Angelis attempted to overtake the Brabham at Surtees Corner, only to make contact and send both cars spinning. Piquet duly went through into the lead, while Patrese rejoined the track ahead of Prost but was soon caught and passed by the Renault. De Angelis also rejoined, but continued for only two laps before retiring with an engine failure.

At quarter distance, Piquet led Prost by around 10 seconds, with Patrese a further 10 seconds back and holding up Cheever, René Arnoux, Mansell and Patrick Tambay. On lap 20 Arnoux spun at Surtees, dropping him to the back of the field. There were no further changes among the front-runners until the pit stops, during which both Brabhams hit trouble: Patrese was delayed by a misfitted rear wheel, while Piquet was held up by a malfunctioning wheel-nut gun. Piquet nonetheless retained his lead over Prost, while an unscheduled second stop for Cheever (due to a loose helmet visor which was taped by his pit crew) left Tambay in third and Mansell fourth, with Andrea de Cesaris up to fifth in the Alfa Romeo and Derek Warwick sixth in the Toleman.

In the closing stages, Tambay suffered brake problems, allowing Mansell past on lap 66 before spinning off at Druids two laps later. This moved the second Toleman of Bruno Giacomelli into the top six, while also ending Tambay's challenge for the Drivers' Championship. Shortly afterwards, Warwick had a bizarre accident when his cockpit fire extinguisher leaked, giving him burns to his right hand and leg, though he held on to fifth place.

Up front, Piquet cruised to his second consecutive win, finishing 6.5 seconds ahead of Prost with Mansell a further 24 seconds back. De Cesaris finished four seconds behind Mansell and ten ahead of Warwick, who in turn finished eight seconds ahead of teammate Giacomelli. Patrese ultimately finished seventh, while Arnoux was ninth and Cheever tenth, both one lap down on Piquet. With one race to go, Prost still led the Drivers' Championship but by only two points over Piquet, while Arnoux's failure to score left him needing to win in South Africa to have any chance of the title.

The race also saw the last appearance of the Theodore team, which was struggling financially and had scaled back to one car for Roberto Guerrero. Guerrero finished 12th, one place ahead of Palmer's Williams.

Race classification

Championship standings after the race

Drivers' Championship standings

Constructors' Championship standings

Note: Only the top five positions are included for both sets of standings.

References

European Grand Prix
European Grand Prix
European Grand Prix
European Grand Prix